Picea omorika, common name Pančić spruce or Serbian spruce, is a species of coniferous tree endemic to the Drina River valley in western Serbia, and eastern Bosnia and Herzegovina, with a total range of only about 60 ha, at  altitude. It was originally discovered near the Serbian village of Zaovine, on Mount Tara, in 1875, and named by the Serbian botanist Josif Pančić; the specific epithet omorika is simply the Serbian word for the tree. (All other spruces are smrča).

Description

The shoots are buff-brown, and densely pubescent (hairy). The leaves are needle-like, 10–20 mm long, flattened in cross-section, dark blue-green above, and blue-white below.

Cultivation
Outside its native range, Serbian spruce is of major importance as an ornamental tree in large gardens, valued in northern Europe and North America for its very attractive crown form and ability to grow on a wide range of soils, including alkaline, clay, acid and sandy soil, although it prefers moist, drained loam.

It is also grown to a small extent in forestry for Christmas trees, timber and paper production, particularly in northern Europe, though its slow growth makes it less important than Sitka spruce or Norway spruce. In cultivation, it has produced hybrids with the closely related Black spruce P. × Machala and also with Sitka spruce.

AGM cultivars
The following cultivars have gained the Royal Horticultural Society's Award of Garden Merit: 
Picea omorika 
Picea omorika ′Nana′ (dwarf form) 
Picea omorika ′Pendula′ (weeping form)

Ecology
Because of its limited range, it is not a major source of nutrition to wildlife, but does provide cover for birds and small mammals. Prior to the Pleistocene ice ages, it had a much larger range throughout most of Europe.

References

External links
 
 Picea omorika - information, genetic conservation units and related resources. European Forest Genetic Resources Programme (EUFORGEN)

Trees of Europe
omorika
Vulnerable plants
Flora of Serbia